Bellpuig is a Rodalies de Catalunya station serving Bellpuig in Catalonia, Spain. It is owned by Adif and served by regional line .

The station is served daily by six trains to Lleida and five trains to Cervera, three of which continue towards L'Hospitalet de Llobregat via Barcelona.

References

External links
 Bellpuig listing at Rodalies de Catalunya website
 Information and photos of the station at trenscat.cat 

Railway stations in Catalonia
Rodalies de Catalunya stations
Transport in Urgell